Nordenskiöld Land National Park was a national park in Spitsbergen island in the Svalbard archipelago, Norway. Opened in 2003, the park was disestablished in 2021, and replaced by the significantly larger Van Mijenfjorden National Park, which includes the former national park.

The park covered the southern part of Nordenskiöld Land, on the north shore of Van Mijenfjorden. The park included Reindalen, which is Svalbard's largest ice-free valley and features moraines, rock glaciers, pingos and avalanche features. The valley has lush vegetation and the lower part is a wetland. The area is important for reindeer, Arctic fox, waders, geese and ducks.

References

  Norwegian Directorate for Nature Management on Nordenskiöld Land National Park

National parks of Svalbard
Protected areas established in 2003
2003 establishments in Norway
Ramsar sites in Norway